Castilleja elegans, the elegant Indian paintbrush, is a herbaceous plant species in the genus Castilleja found in Canada.

References

elegans
Flora of Subarctic America
Flora of Alberta
Plants described in 1934
Flora without expected TNC conservation status